Drude Elisabeth Berntsen (born 1939) is a Norwegian computer scientist who was director of the Norwegian Computing Center (Norsk Regnesentral) from 1970 to 1990. It was unusual for a woman to hold such a high-ranking position at a time of male dominance in computing.

Berntsen's publications include a survey of early Norwegian computing developments titled "The Pioneer Era in Norwegian Scientific Computing (1948–1962)". and a biography of Kristen Nygaard, The Many Dimensions of Kristen Nygaard, Creator of Object-Oriented Programming and the Scandinavian School of System Development.

References

1939 births
Living people
Norwegian computer scientists
Norwegian women computer scientists
People from Eidsvoll
20th-century Norwegian women scientists